Peter Hart (10 January 1955, Weardale) is a British military historian.

Hart grew up in Stanhope and Barton under Needwood. He attended school in Chesterfield (1967–73) and Liverpool University (1973–76). He then did a post-graduate teaching course at Crewe & Alsager College (1976–77), and lastly a post-graduate librarianship at Liverpool Polytechnic (1979–80). He has been an oral historian at the Sound Archive of Imperial War Museum in London since 1981.

Hart has written mainly on British participation in the First World War. His books include; The Somme, Jutland 1916, Bloody April on the air war in 1917, Passchendaele, Aces Falling (on the air war in 1918), 1918 A Very British Victory and Gallipoli. He is a regular contributor to Britain at War magazine.

Sources
Peter Hart official website; accessed 11 March 2015.

1955 births
British military historians
Living people
People from Stanhope, County Durham
People from Barton-under-Needwood
Historians of World War I